Kirodimal Institute of Technology (KIT) is a public engineering institute in Raigarh, Chhattisgarh, India. Established in 2000, it is governed under the Kirodimal Polytechnic Society and affiliated to Chhattisgarh Swami Vivekanand Technical University (CSVTU).

Academics
KIT Raigarh offers 4-year Bachelor of Engineering (B.E.) in various fields. The institute admits undergraduate students through the Chhattisgarh Pre Engineering Test  (CG PET).

References

Engineering colleges in Chhattisgarh
Raigarh district
Educational institutions established in 2000
2000 establishments in Chhattisgarh